The Rivière de Grand Goâve is a river of Haiti.

The 12 January 2010 7.0 tremor created a landslide which formed a landslide dam blocking the river, that can potentially contain a large basin of water. Though it is now dry, the wet season is approaching, and a dam collapse would directly outflow the contents through the city of Grand-Goâve. The dam is located a dozen kilometres from the city of Grand-Goâve.

See also
List of rivers of Haiti

References

GEOnet Names Server

Rivers of Haiti